Interstate 220 (I-220) in Mississippi is a loop around Jackson that provides an Interstate connection for I-55 and I-20. The northern terminus for the route is in the northern suburb of Ridgeland, at I-55 exit 104. The highway was Mississippi's first three-digit Interstate, complete by 1981.

Traffic heading to and from the city's western side can use this route. By avoiding downtown Jackson, it also offers a different route for those traveling from I-55 south to I-20 west and from I-20 east to I-55 north.

The southern terminus for the route is in western Jackson at I-20, exit 41. Although control cities of North Jackson and West Jackson are used at the southern and northern termini, respectively, no control cities are used along the interior length of the route (including guide signs at interchanges). Secondary signs at the termini direct drivers to use the route as a shortcut to Memphis, Tennessee and Vicksburg.

Route description
I-220 begins at a southern terminus with I-20, and runs concurrently with U.S. Route 49 (US 49). The first interchange northbound, a partial cloverleaf interchange, is with US 80. The freeway continues north, with an interchange at Clinton Boulevard that provides access to Capitol Street and Bullard Street. After curving to the northeast, I-220 intersects Medgar Evers Boulevard, where US 49 departs from the freeway. The highway also intersects Watkins Drive and Hanging Moss Road before ending at I-55.

Legally, the route of I-220 is defined in Mississippi Code § 65-3-3.

History

The Interstate was first planned in 1971 and was completed by 1981.

A new interchange opened to traffic on I-220 in 2004. This $13.4 million project completed a diamond interchange constructed at Industrial Drive between the Clinton Boulevard and US 49 north junctions. The project also resulted in the expansion of I-220 from four to six lanes from Clinton Boulevard (exit 2A/B) northward to Industrial Drive.

Exit list

References

20-2
20-2 Mississippi
220 Mississippi
Interstate 220
Interstate 220